Heteragrionidae is a family of damselflies in the order Odonata. There are more than 50 described species in Heteragrionidae, found mainly in Central and South America.

Genera
 Dimeragrion Calvert, 1913
 Heteragrion Selys, 1862
 Heteropodagrion Selys, 1885
 Oxystigma Selys, 1862

References

Calopterygoidea
Odonata families